Amphiscolops is a genus of acoels belonging to the family Convolutidae.

The species of this genus are found in America.

Species
The following species are recognised in the genus Amphiscolops:

Amphiscolops bermudensis 
Amphiscolops castellonensis 
Amphiscolops cinereus 
Amphiscolops evelinae 
Amphiscolops fuligineus 
Amphiscolops gemelliporus 
Amphiscolops gerundensis 
Amphiscolops japonicus 
Amphiscolops marinelliensis 
Amphiscolops mosaicus 
Amphiscolops potocani 
Amphiscolops trifurcatus 
Amphiscolops zeii

References

Acoelomorphs